The Japan national handball team is the national handball team of Japan and is controlled by the Japan Handball Association.

Results

Summer Olympics
 1972 – 11th place
 1976 – 9th place
 1984 – 10th place
 1988 – 11th place
 2020 – 11th place

World Championship
 1961 – 12th place
 1964 – 16th place
 1967 – 11th place
 1970 – 10th place
 1974 – 12th place
 1978 – 12th place
 1982 – 14th place
 1990 – 15th place
 1995 – 23rd place
 1997 – 15th place
 2005 – 16th place
 2011 – 16th place
 2017 – 22nd place
 2019 – 24th place
 2021 – 18th place

Asian Championship
 1977 – 1st place
 1979 – 1st place
 1983 – 2nd place
 1987 – 2nd place
 1989 – 2nd place
 1991 – 2nd place
 1993 – 3rd place
 1995 – 4th place
 2000 – 3rd place
 2002 – 6th place
 2004 – 2nd place
 2006 – 5th place
 2008 – 6th place
 2010 – 3rd place
 2012 – 4th place
 2014 – 9th place
 2016 – 3rd place
 2018 – 6th place
 2020 – 3rd place
 2022 – Withdrawn

Current squad
Squad for the 2021 World Men's Handball Championship.

Head coach:  Dagur Sigurðsson

References

External links

IHF profile

Handball in Japan
Men's national handball teams
Handball